Joshua Turek (born April 12, 1979) is currently a member of the Iowa House of Representatives for the 20th district. He was formerly an American wheelchair basketball player and a member of the United States men's national wheelchair basketball team.

Political career
Josh Turek won election to the 20th district (Council Bluffs and Carter Lake, Iowa) in 2022 and took office at the start of 2023. He has worked extensively as an advocate for disabled peoples, introducing a variety of bills to uplift the community. He is an avid supporter of public education and has spoken out against the implementation of school voucher programs in Iowa and elsewhere. Josh is a defender of organized labor and the rights of working peoples. According to his campaign website - improving access to quality, affordable healthcare is also a major priority for him. Josh enters the Iowa state legislature as the first permanently disabled member in its history.

Paralympic career
Turek has represented the United States in Wheelchair basketball at the Summer Paralympics four times, finishing in seventh place in 2004, winning a bronze medal in 2012 and gold medals in 2016 and 2020.

Personal life
His brother, John, and sister, Elisha, are both retired professional basketball players.

References

External links
 

1979 births
Living people
Sportspeople from Council Bluffs, Iowa
American men's wheelchair basketball players
Paralympic wheelchair basketball players of the United States
Paralympic medalists in wheelchair basketball
Paralympic gold medalists for the United States
Paralympic bronze medalists for the United States
Wheelchair basketball players at the 2004 Summer Paralympics
Wheelchair basketball players at the 2012 Summer Paralympics
Wheelchair basketball players at the 2016 Summer Paralympics
Wheelchair basketball players at the 2020 Summer Paralympics
Medalists at the 2012 Summer Paralympics
Medalists at the 2016 Summer Paralympics
Medalists at the 2020 Summer Paralympics
Medalists at the 2011 Parapan American Games
Medalists at the 2015 Parapan American Games
Medalists at the 2019 Parapan American Games
Basketball players from Iowa
21st-century American people